The Administration of Justice Act 1970 (c. 31) is a UK Act of Parliament. Section 11 reforms the Debtors Act 1869 by further restricting the circumstances in which debtors may be sent to prison. Section 40 includes a number of provisions forbidding creditors such as debt collection agencies from harassing debtors, including:
 Excessive demands for payment
 Falsely claiming that criminal proceedings will follow after failing to pay a debt
 Falsely pretending to be officially authorised to collect payment
 Producing false documents claiming to have some official status that they do not have

Section 36 was enacted to return the law to the position which it was generally thought to be, and applied by the courts since the mid 1930s, before the landmark bar to adjournments applied by the courts since 1962 in the decision of Birmingham Citizens Permanent Building Society v Caunt [1962] which had put an end to a practice under which mortgage possession summonses were adjourned to give the mortgagor an opportunity to pay by instalments. It had intended to restore the position to what it had previously been thought to be. The section did not however cover those mortgages excluding section 103 of the Law of Property Act 1925.

Section 1 transferred certain non-family matters away from what was then called the Probate, Divorce and Admiralty Division and renamed it as the Family Division.

See also
Administration of Justice Act

References

External links
 

United Kingdom Acts of Parliament 1970